Cue Ball Wizard is a pinball machine designed by Jon Norris and released in December 18 1992 by Gottlieb. It features a cue sports theme and was advertised with the slogan "Gottlieb Presents CUE BALL WIZARD!".

Description
Cue Ball Wizard has a two and three ball Multiball and an oscillating captive ball kicker at the upper playfield. Its most noticeable feature, a full-sized captive cue ball that can be used to hit two elevated targets, is placed below on the lower playfield.

The ramp is the game's most important shot, as it has to be hit once to light it up for the wagon wheel award. In the wagon wheel are all the modes the player must finish to reach Pool Ball Mania.

Game quotes
 "You found the King, Baby."
 "What kind of cow pie shot was that?"
 "Get the ball up the ramp here."
 "One More For Double"
 "Chalk Up Partner"
 "Quit talking and start chalking!"
 "You sure need that ramp shot."
 "Make my day."
 "I hate these outlanes."
 "That's what you call the Bank Shot!"
 "Time's up!"

Digital versions
Cue Ball Wizard is available as a licensed table of The Pinball Arcade for several platforms and also included in the Windows version of Microsoft Pinball Arcade.

See also
Big Shot - a pool themed pinball machine by Gottlieb
Eight Ball Deluxe - a cue sports themed pinball machine by Bally

References

External links
 

1992 pinball machines
Gottlieb pinball machines